Shirley Victoria Hodgson, FRCP, FRSB (née Penrose; born 22 February 1945) is a British geneticist.

Biography
Hodgson studied at Somerville College, Oxford. She worked as a GP, then performed as locum in clinical genetics at Guy's Hospital, saying she found the subject "irresistible". She became Senior Registrar in Clinical Genetics for the South Thames (East) Regional Genetics Centre and Honorary Senior Registrar at Hammersmith Hospital, London, from 1983 to 1988; then Consultant Geneticist at Addenbrooke's Hospital from 1988–1990. In the 1990s, she led the regional cancer genetics service at Guy's and St Thomas' Hospital.

She has been Professor of Cancer Genetics at St George's, University of London since 2003.

Hodgson is the daughter of Lionel Penrose and his wife Margaret Leathes, and the granddaughter of the physiologist John Beresford Leathes.  She has three older brothers, Oliver, Sir Roger and the late Jonathan Penrose. She married Humphrey Hodgson in 1971.

She is a Fellow of the Royal College of Physicians, and a Fellow of the Royal Society of Biology.

Works 
Hodgson is the author of many academic papers and several books, including:

References

External links 
 

1945 births
Alumni of Somerville College, Oxford
Living people
Fellows of the Royal College of Physicians
Fellows of the Royal Society of Biology
British geneticists
British people of Russian-Jewish descent
Women geneticists